The United States Virgin Islands general election was held on 6 November 2012.  Voters chose the non-voting delegate to the United States House of Representatives, the Board of Education, the Board of Elections, and all fifteen seats in the Legislature of the Virgin Islands.

References